Haydons Road railway station is in the north-east of the London Borough of Merton in South London. It is the nearest station to the Plough Lane stadium, the home ground of AFC Wimbledon.

The station is served by Thameslink trains on the Sutton Loop Line and is in Travelcard Zone 3.

History

It was opened, originally as Haydens Lane, by the Tooting, Merton and Wimbledon Railway (itself jointly owned by the London and South Western Railway and the London, Brighton and South Coast Railway) on 1 October 1868. The ticket office is on the up side of the station; the original station buildings were redeveloped by British Rail during 1991 and 1992 when land adjacent to the up platform was redeveloped for housing. Until the advent of Thameslink it was served by the London Bridge loop trains via Wimbledon.

Services
All services at Haydons Road are operated by Thameslink using  EMUs.

The typical off-peak service in trains per hour is:
 2 tph to 
 2 tph to  via 

Connections
London Buses route 200 serves the station, connection to 156, 493 and N87 at Plough Lane is within walking distance of the station.

References

External links

Railway stations in the London Borough of Merton
Former Tooting, Merton and Wimbledon Railway stations
Railway stations in Great Britain opened in 1868
Railway stations in Great Britain closed in 1917
Railway stations in Great Britain opened in 1923
Railway stations served by Govia Thameslink Railway
1868 establishments in England